 

Matt Weinstock (1903–1970) was a  managing editor of the Los Angeles Illustrated Daily News and a columnist for three Los Angeles, California, newspapers for 33 years.

Weinstock, the son of Frank Weinstock, a clothing manufacturer, and Sarah Weinstock, was born in Pittsburgh, Pennsylvania, on February 12, 1903, and moved with his family to Los Angeles when he was eight years old. He graduated from Los Angeles High School in 1920, then spent three years at UCLA, where he was sports editor of the student newspaper, the California Grizzly.  He left school in 1924 to become a sports reporter for the Daily News.

He was made managing editor of the newspaper in 1934 by publisher Manchester Boddy and took over the duties of writing a regular column three years later when E.V. Durling, the featured columnist for the newspaper, left for the Los Angeles Times.  He recalled that "I couldn't find anyone" to replace Durling, "and in desperation I filled in as columnist myself. . . . I had to make a choice. I chose the column job, rejecting that as managing editor. It seemed a stupid thing to do at the time, but it has proved very wise."

Weinstock wrote for the Daily News until it ended publication in 1954, when he joined Harry Chandler's new afternoon newspaper, the Los Angeles Mirror. He moved to the Times in November 1961 when the Mirror folded. 

He died of cancer on January 8, 1970. He was survived by his wife, Hilda of Malibu; a son, James Weinstock; two daughters, Mrs. Joy Clement and Mrs. Jane Krigbaum; and two brothers, Herbert  and Charles Weinstock. Private services were held at Westwood Memorial Park.

Books

See also

 List of newspaper columnists

References

American editors
1903 births
1970 deaths
Writers from Pittsburgh